The first season of the Japanese science fiction action anime TV series Log Horizon premiered on NHK Educational TV October 5, 2013, and concluded on March 22, 2014, with a total of 25 episodes.

Elder Tales, a massively multiplayer online role-playing game (MMORPG), has become a global success by its eleventh expansion pack, having a following of millions of players. During the release of its twelfth expansion pack— Novasphere Pioneers, thirty thousand Japanese gamers who are all logged on at the time of the update, suddenly find themselves transported inside the game world and donning their in-game avatars. In the midst of the event, a socially awkward gamer called Shiroe along with his friends Naotsugu and Akatsuki team up so that they may face this world which has now become their reality along with the challenges which lie ahead.

The anime was produced by Satelight Studios and directed by Shinji Ishihira, along with series composition by Toshizo Nemoto, character designs by Mariko Ito based on the original designs by Kazuhiro Hara, art direction by Yuki Nomura, sound direction by Shoji Hata and soundtrack music by Yasuharu Takanashi. The series was picked up by Crunchyroll for online simulcast streaming in North America and other select parts of the world. The Anime Network later obtained the series for streaming. Kadokawa Shoten released the series in Japan on eight Blu-ray and DVD volumes beginning on January 29, 2014. The anime was licensed for a home video release in 2014 by Sentai Filmworks in North America. Madman Entertainment later licensed the series for a 2015 release in Australia and New Zealand. This was followed by a license by MVM Entertainment for release in the United Kingdom. Funimation acquired the streaming rights after Sentai Filmworks lost them.

The opening theme is "database" by Man With A Mission ft. Takuma while the ending theme is "Your song*" by Yunchi.


Episode list

Home media release
Kadokawa Shoten released the series in Japan on eight Blu-ray and DVD volumes between January 29 and August 27, 2014. Sentai Filmworks released the complete series on two Blu-ray and DVD collections on November 25, 2014 and January 27, 2015. MVM Entertainment will follow with their own BD and DVD releases on April 13 and May 11, 2015 respectively. These releases contain both English and Japanese audio options and English subtitles.

Notes

References

External links
  
 

2013 Japanese television seasons
01